Galium austriacum, the Austrian bedstraw, is a plant species in the Rubiaceae. It was first described in 1773 by Austrian botanist Nicolaus Jacquin as part of his Florae Austriaceae (i.e., Flora of Austria), the Austrian Empire in 1773 having been rather larger than the present-day Republic of Austria. The species is found in mountainous regions of present-day Austria, Switzerland, Italy (Piemonte and Toscana), the Czech Republic, Slovakia, Hungary, and the former Yugoslavia.

References

External links
Czech Botany, svízel rakouský / lipkavec rakúsky, Galium austriacum
Bilder von Österreichs Flora, Galium austriacum / Österreich- Labkraut

austriacum
Flora of Austria
Flora of Switzerland
Flora of France
Flora of Italy
Flora of the Czech Republic
Flora of Slovakia
Flora of Hungary
Flora of Slovenia
Flora of Croatia
Flora of Serbia
Flora of Kosovo
Flora of Montenegro
Flora of Bosnia and Herzegovina
Plants described in 1773
Taxa named by Nikolaus Joseph von Jacquin